Aleid of Poelgeest (Koudekerk aan den Rijn, c. 1370 - The Hague, September 22, 1392) was the mistress of the Count of Holland, Albert I of Bavaria.

Life
Aleid van Poelgeest was the daughter of the court official Jan van Poelgeest and Aleid van Beest Gerbrandsdr.  She is traditionally assumed to have served as a maid-of-honour to the spouse of Albert, Margaret of Brieg, prior to becoming his mistress.  She never married.

van Poelgeest is noted to have been present at court at least since 1386. In June 1388, Albert gave her an allowance, her own house and maids and installed her as his official mistress.  It was noted that she followed him around on his journeys in his domains.  She was reputed to have had great influence over Albert, but whether this was true is unconfirmed.

She was murdered along with the "Meesterknaap" (a high court dignitary), William Cuser in The Hague by Hook nobles.  Why exactly Aleid was killed, is not certain.

Albrecht saw the murder as a personal attack on his authority and used this event to settle some scores with a number of political opponents.

References

People murdered in the Netherlands
Medieval Dutch women
Mistresses of German royalty
14th-century women of the Holy Roman Empire